Lites is a discontinued  Unix-like operating system, based on 4.4BSD and the Mach microkernel. Specifically, Lites is a multi-threaded server and emulation library that provided unix functions to a Mach-based system. At the time of its release, Lites provided binary compatibility with 4.4BSD, NetBSD, FreeBSD, 386BSD, UX (4.3BSD), and Linux.

Lites was originally written by Johannes Helander at Helsinki University of Technology, and was further developed by the Flux Research Group at the University of Utah.

See also
 HPBSD

References

External links
 , Utah Lites

Berkeley Software Distribution
Mach (kernel)
Microkernel-based operating systems
Microkernels